KCMU-LP is a low-power FM radio station broadcasting a variety format from Napa, California, on 103.3 FM. It went on the air on July 22, 2015.

References

External links

Napa, California
2015 establishments in California
CMU-LP
Radio stations established in 2015
Variety radio stations in the United States
CMU-LP